Patrick Lange (25 August 1986) is a professional duathlete and triathlete from Germany. He is the 2017 Ironman World Champion and the 2018 Ironman World Champion both times breaking the course record. Lange is also the 2010-2013 German champion in duathlon and the 2012 and 2013 German champion in team triathlon with EJOT Team TV Buschhütten.

In 2008 Lange won the military world championships team Triathlon in Estonia and made Bronze in the ITU Duathlon Short Distance World Championships mixed team 2012 in Nancy (France).

In 2018 he won the Ironman World Championships in Kona for second consecutive year with a new course record of 7:52:38, the first time the race has been finished in under 8 hours. At the 2016 Ironman World Championships, Lange had a breakthrough performance and placed third behind Jan Frodeno and Sebastian Kienle. Lange completed a 48:57 swim, a 4:37:39 bike and a 2:39:45 run (the current marathon record in Ironman World Championships) to finish in 8:11:14. In 2017, Lange placed first at the Ironman World Championship. Having completed a 48:45 swim, a 4:28:53 bike and a 2:40:00 run, Lange won the race in a total time of 8:01:40, beating Craig Alexander's 2011 record of 8:03:56. After breaking the course record, during celebrations, Lange duly apologized to Craig Alexander for breaking his previously held record.

Lange starts for DSW 1912 Darmstadt. His trainer is Faris Al-Sultan.

References

External links 
 Official website of Patrick Lange

German male triathletes
1986 births
Living people
People from Bad Wildungen
Sportspeople from Kassel (region)
Ironman world champions